William Cordes "Rudy" Schlesinger (born November 5, 1941) is an American former professional baseball player. He had one at bat in Major League Baseball as a pinch hitter for the  Boston Red Sox. He spent much of his seven-year (1964–70) professional career in the Red Sox organization, although Boston would lose him on waivers once, trade him twice, and reacquire him twice in the space of four seasons.

An outfielder, Schlesinger was signed by Boston in 1963 out of the University of Cincinnati, where he graduated with a degree in education. After hitting 37 home runs, driving in 117 runs, and batting .341 in the 1964 Class A New York–Penn League (then a full season circuit), he was protected under the bonus rules of the 1960s on the 1965 Red Sox roster coming out of spring training.
 
In Schlesinger's only MLB appearance, on May 4, he batted for Boston pitcher Dave Morehead in the sixth inning against the Los Angeles Angels at Chavez Ravine. Schlesinger grounded out (pitcher Marcelino López to first baseman Costen Shockley). Boston lost the game, 7–1, one of 100 defeats the BoSox would absorb in 1965. Three days later, when the Red Sox tried to send Schlesinger to the minor leagues, they had to pass him through waivers and he was claimed by the Kansas City Athletics. Thus began the "yo-yo" nature of his career.  

After parts of two seasons in the Athletics' farm system, the Red Sox reacquired Schlesinger in 1966 and he played the entire 1967 campaign with the Double-A Pittsfield Red Sox, belting 21 home runs. Then, during the winter meetings on November 30, 1967, he was traded with cash to the Chicago Cubs for pitcher Ray Culp. It was a one-sided deal: for the Red Sox, Culp averaged 16 wins over the next four seasons, while Schlesinger struggled in the Cubs system in 1968 before being reacquired by the Red Sox in midseason and returning to Pittsfield. He then began 1969 with Boston's Louisville Colonels affiliate. After only 50 at bats in Louisville, the parent Red Sox traded him again, this time to the Philadelphia Phillies for veteran outfielder Don Lock.  Schlesinger played the remainder of his pro career with the Phillies' Triple-A club, the Eugene Emeralds, in 1969–70.  All told, he batted .270 with 127 home runs in 732 minor league games.

See also
1965 Boston Red Sox season
Boston Red Sox all-time roster
Cup of coffee

References

External links

Retrosheet
May 4, 1965 - Box Score

1941 births
Living people
Baseball players from Cincinnati
Boston Red Sox players
Burlington Bees players
Cincinnati Bearcats baseball players
Eugene Emeralds players
Lewiston Broncs players
Louisville Colonels (minor league) players
Mobile A's players
Pittsfield Red Sox players
San Antonio Missions players
Tacoma Cubs players
University of Cincinnati alumni
Wellsville Red Sox players
Winston-Salem Red Sox players